Acrolophus libitina is a moth of the family Acrolophidae first described by Herbert Druce in 1901.

References

Moths described in 1901
libitina